Puttakkana Makkalu is a 2021 Indian Kannada television soap opera that telecasts on ZEE5 even before TV telecast. This series is directed by Arooru Jagadish who is the director of the TV series Jothe Jotheyali. It was premiered on 13 December 2021 airing from Monday to Friday on Zee Kannada. The show is a remake of Telugu serial Radhamma Kuthuru, which airs on Zee Telugu. The series stars Umashree, Manju Bhashini, Ramesh Pandit, Sanjana, Akshara and Shilpa.

Cast 
 Umashree as Puttakka
 Akshara As Sahana 
 Sanjana Burli As Sneha 
 Shilpa As Suma 
 Dhanush NS As Kanti 
 Manju Bhashini as Bangaramma 
 Hamsa Pratap As Rajeshwari
 Ramesh Pandit As Gopala

Reception

Ratings
Puttakkana Makkalu topped in TRP charts with 13.5 TVR in it's opening.

Adaptations

References

External links
Puttakkana Makkalu at ZEE5

Zee Kannada original programming
Kannada-language television shows
Television shows set in Karnataka
Indian television soap operas
Serial drama television series
2021 Indian television series debuts